David Mercer (born 1976) is a technical writer of programming, web development and business books.

Mercer has contributed editorially to a number of titles for the open source community, including books on Linux and Perl. He has also written books on PHP and Web technology.

His technical books are sold worldwide and have been translated into French, German, Polish, Greek and Spanish. His book on Drupal 6 was reviewed on Slashdot and went on to become a best seller. Mercer's books have also become recommended reading at higher learning institutes like MIT.

He maintains an online business blog to provide supplementary skills and knowledge for his readership.

Published Titles

References

External links

 SME Pals – Author homepage
 Wiley
 Drupal.org
 GoodReads
 Acquia Interview

1976 births
Living people
American business writers